Desirée Wynea Cheng (born September 28, 1996) is a Filipino volleyball athlete. She played with De La Salle University collegiate women's varsity volleyball team.

Personal life
Cheng is the youngest of three siblings. She completed her high school studies at Hope Christian High School and earned her AB Sports Studies degree from De La Salle University.

Career
Cheng won the UAAP Season 79 Finals MVP after DLSU Lady Spikers defeated the Ateneo Lady Eagles in the finals.

Cheng won the Best Server award in UAAP Season 80. They defeated the FEU Lady Tamaraws in the finals claiming a 3-peat championship title.

With F2 Logistics Cargo Movers, Cheng won the 2017 PSL Grand Prix Conference championship.

Clubs
  F2 Logistics Cargo Movers (2017–2021)
  Choco Mucho Flying Titans (2022–present)

Awards

Individual
 2011 Palarong Pambansa "Most Valuable Player"
 2011 Palarong Maynila "Most Valuable Player"
 2012 Palarong Pambansa "Most Valuable Player"
 2012 Palarong Maynila "Most Valuable Player"
 2013 Palarong Pambansa "Most Valuable Player"
 2013 Palarong Pambansa "Best Blocker"
 UAAP Season 79 "Finals Most Valuable Player"
 UAAP Season 80 "Best Server"

Collegiate
 2014 UAAP Season 76 volleyball tournaments -  Silver medal, with  De La Salle Lady Spikers
 2015 UAAP Season 77 volleyball tournaments -  Silver medal, with  De La Salle Lady Spikers
 2017 UAAP Season 79 volleyball tournaments -  Champion, with  De La Salle Lady Spikers
 2018 UAAP Season 80 volleyball tournaments -  Champion, with  De La Salle Lady Spikers
 2019 UAAP Season 81 volleyball tournaments -  Bronze medal, with De La Salle Lady Spikers

Clubs
 2017 Philippine SuperLiga Grand Prix –  Champion, with F2 Logistics Cargo Movers

References

1996 births
Living people
Filipino people of Chinese descent
Filipino women's volleyball players
University Athletic Association of the Philippines volleyball players
De La Salle University alumni
Volleyball players from Metro Manila
Outside hitters
Sportspeople from Manila